Gabriele Palme (born 26 April 1964) is a German handball player. She participated at the 1992 Summer Olympics, where the German national team placed fourth.

References 
 

1964 births
Living people
People from Staßfurt
People from Bezirk Magdeburg
German female handball players
Sportspeople from Saxony-Anhalt
Olympic handball players of Germany
Handball players at the 1992 Summer Olympics
20th-century German women